Events from the year 1800 in Canada.

Incumbents
Monarch: George III

Federal government
Parliament of Lower Canada: 2nd (until June 4)
Parliament of Upper Canada: 2nd (until July 4)

Governors
Governor of the Canadas: Robert Milnes
Governor of New Brunswick: Thomas Carleton
Governor of Nova Scotia: John Wentworth
Commodore-Governor of Newfoundland: Charles Morice Pole
Governor of St. John's Island: Edmund Fanning

Events
 Spain cedes Louisiana back to France.
 Alexander Mackenzie, the explorer, joins XY Fur Company
 April – United Irish Uprising in Newfoundland
 May 30 – Bar of Quebec is founded
 August – Upper Canada expands westward and further into the interior, as the first settlers arrive at the upper Grand River

Births
January 3 – Etienne-Michel Faillon, Catholic historian (d.1870)
August 22 – Edward Barron Chandler, politician (d.1880)
October 21 – René-Édouard Caron, 2nd Mayor of Quebec City and 2nd Lieutenant-Governor of Quebec (d.1876)
October 22 – James Ferrier, merchant, politician and 4th Mayor of Montreal (d.1888)
November 21 – William Agar Adamson, Church of England clergyman and author (d.1868)

Deaths
 March 16 – Jean-Joseph Casot, last jesuit in Canada.

References

 
99a